Honnedaga Brook is a stream in the Adirondack Mountains of the U.S. state of New York.

References

Rivers of New York (state)
Rivers of Hamilton County, New York
Rivers of Herkimer County, New York